Faouzi El Brazi (born 22 May 1977 in Berkane) is a retired footballer.

El Brazi played for Morocco at the 2000 Summer Olympics.

References

External links
 
 
 

1977 births
Living people
Moroccan footballers
Moroccan expatriate footballers
Morocco international footballers
Olympic footballers of Morocco
Footballers at the 2000 Summer Olympics
2002 African Cup of Nations players
Ligue 2 players
Eredivisie players
Servette FC players
FC Twente players
FC Istres players
AS FAR (football) players
Wydad AC players
Expatriate footballers in the Netherlands
Expatriate footballers in France
Expatriate footballers in Switzerland
Moroccan expatriate sportspeople in the Netherlands
Moroccan expatriate sportspeople in France
Moroccan expatriate sportspeople in Switzerland
Association football midfielders
People from Berkane